This is a list of films which have placed number one at the weekend box office in Brazil during 2016.

Films

References

2016
2016 in Brazil
Braz